Marsh v. Buck, 313 U.S. 406 (1941), was a United States Supreme Court case in which the Court held General statements that the law will be enforced if enacted are not threats against entities subject to the law.

References

External links
 

1941 in United States case law
United States Supreme Court cases
United States Supreme Court cases of the Hughes Court